Adenylosuccinate is an intermediate in the interconversion of purine nucleotides inosine monophosphate (IMP) and adenosine monophosphate (AMP). The enzyme adenylosuccinate synthase carries out the reaction by the addition of aspartate to IMP and requires the input of energy from a phosphoanhydride bond in the form of guanosine triphosphate (GTP).  GTP is used instead of adenosine triphosphate (ATP), so the reaction is not dependent on its products.

See also
 Adenylosuccinate lyase deficiency
 Purine nucleotide cycle

References

Nucleotides